Sébastien Lepape (born 4 July 1991, in Montivilliers) is a French male short track speed skater.

References

External links
 Sébastien Lepape's profile, from http://www.sochi2014.com; retrieved 2014-02-10.

1991 births
Living people
French male short track speed skaters
Olympic short track speed skaters of France
Short track speed skaters at the 2014 Winter Olympics
Short track speed skaters at the 2018 Winter Olympics
Short track speed skaters at the 2022 Winter Olympics
21st-century French people